Mountain View, also known as the Fishburn Mansion, is a historic home in the Mountain View neighborhood in Roanoke, Virginia. It is a -story, rectangular Georgian Revival-style house that was built in 1907. It features a colossal portico consisting of two clusters of three fluted Ionic order columns supporting an Ionic entablature topped by a pediment containing a lunette. It also has a series of one-story porches, a conservatory, and a porte cochere.

It was listed on the National Register of Historic Places in 1980.

References

External links
Mountain View - Roanoke, Virginia on Waymarking.com

Houses completed in 1907
Georgian Revival architecture in Virginia
Houses on the National Register of Historic Places in Virginia
Houses in Roanoke, Virginia
National Register of Historic Places in Roanoke, Virginia